Glipostenoda incognita is a species of beetle in the genus Glipostenoda. It was described in 1962.

References

incognita
Beetles described in 1962